The Apotheosis of Homer is an oil on canvas painting by Salvador Dalí, created c. 1945. It is at the 
Bayerische Staatsgemäldesammlungen, Pinakothek der Moderne, in Munich.

References

External links
http://www.3d-dali.com/Tour/apotheosis.htm

1945 paintings
Paintings by Salvador Dalí
Cultural depictions of Homer
Paintings in the collection of the Pinakothek der Moderne